Wake Up Everybody was a compilation album released to coincide with the 2004 presidential election in the U.S. It featured a variety of musical stars, primarily hip hop and R&B artists, who sing songs to urge young Americans to vote. The executive producers of the album were Kenneth "Babyface" Edmonds, Tracey Edmonds, Russell Simmons and Jonathan Lewis. The project was a collaboration with America Coming Together, a political group with the goal of defeating incumbent President George W. Bush. Despite this connection, the album was portrayed by its producers as a non-partisan project.

In August 2004, the project began with the reworking of "Wake Up Everybody", a 1976 R&B hit song by Harold Melvin & the Blue Notes. The new version of the song was released for radio airplay on August 16 and it reached number 119 on the Billboard Hot R&B/Hip-Hop Songs Chart. The song was released for retail purchase in album form on September 16. The artists featured on the song are Missy Elliott, Ashanti, Mariah Carey, Mary J. Blige, Brandy, Wyclef Jean, Monica, Eve, Queen Latifah, Usher, Snoop Dogg, Musiq, Jamie Foxx, Rev Run and Russell Simmons. Also on the track are Jadakiss, Fabolous, Mýa, Faith Evans, Claudette Ortiz, Ray J, Tamia, Nate Dogg, Robin Thicke, Floetry, Joss Stone, Bilal, Jon B, MC Lyte, Nas, Ellie Lawson, Omarion and Raphael Saadiq. The album release includes other reworked songs and also previously released songs. It ends with a 50-minute behind-the-scenes documentary on the making of the album, which highlights the remarkable speed with which these artists came together to support the cause.

The Vote For Change tour of September–October 2004, also benefiting America Coming Together (ACT), was joined by Babyface appearing on the same stage as John Mellencamp in six cities, the final performance held with multiple artists at the MCI Center in Washington DC. The various tour dates raised about $10 million for ACT.

Featured artists

Akon
Ashanti
Kenneth "Babyface" Edmonds
Ben Jelen
Bilal
Bonnie McKee
Bonnie Raitt
Brandy
Claudette Ortiz
Don Yute
Eric Clapton
Ellie Lawson
Emmylou Harris
Everclear
Eve
Fabolous
Faith Evans
Farena
Floetry
Freckles
Jadakiss
Jamie Foxx
Jaheim
Jon B
Joss Stone
Julia Fordham
Jurassic 5
Kristine W
Lady Saw
Lenny Kravitz
Mariah Carey
Mary J. Blige
Marques Houston
Matt Nathanson
MC Lyte
Monica
Miri Ben-Ari
Missy Elliott
Mrnorth
Musiq
Mýa
Mystic
Nas
Nate Dogg
Of a Revolution
Omarion
Queen Latifah
Ray J
Raphael Saadiq
Rev Run
Res
Robin Thicke
Russell Simmons
Seal
Snoop Dogg
Solange Knowles
The Latin Kings
Tamia
Tracey Edmonds
Toni Braxton
Tweet
Usher
Wayne Wonder
Wyclef Jean
Yoko Ono

Track listing 
"Wake Up Everybody" - Various Artists
"Give Peace a Chance 2004" - Yoko Ono
"Why the Fighting" - Ellie Lawson
"Talking About a Revolution" - Ben Jelen
"Hell to Pay" - Bonnie Raitt
"Freedom" - Jurassic 5
"Fear" - Lenny Kravitz
"Raise This Land" - Freckles featuring Res and Mystic
"Get It Together" - Seal
"Time in Babylon" - Emmylou Harris
"This Land Is Your Land" - Everclear
"Right on Time" - O.A.R.
"Speak No Evil" - Mr. North
"The Wind" - Matt Nathanson
"One Sound" - TLK, Lady Saw, Wayne Wonder, Don Yute and Farena
"Change the World" - Eric Clapton & Babyface

References

2004 compilation albums
Albums produced by Babyface (musician)